Jenny's Stroll Through Men is a 1929 German silent film directed by Jaap Speyer and starring Ferry Sikla, Olga Limburg, and Harry Halm.

The film's art direction was by Bernhard Klein and Bruno Lutz.

Cast

References

Bibliography

External links

1929 films
Films of the Weimar Republic
Films directed by Jaap Speyer
German silent feature films
Terra Film films
German black-and-white films
1920s German films